Ephierodula excellens is a species of praying mantis that may be endemic to Vietnam.

References 

Mantodea of Asia
Insects of Vietnam